This glossary of agriculture is a list of definitions of terms and concepts used in agriculture, its sub-disciplines, and related fields. For other glossaries relevant to agricultural science, see Glossary of biology, Glossary of ecology, Glossary of environmental science, and Glossary of botanical terms.

A

B

C

D

E

F

G

H

I

J

L

M

N

O

P

R

S

T

U

V

W

X

Y

See also
Index of agriculture articles
Outline of agriculture
Outline of organic gardening and farming
Outline of sustainable agriculture

References

External links
Agricultural Thesaurus and Glossary – National Agricultural Library, United States Department of Agriculture
Agriculture: A Glossary of Terms, Programs, and Laws, 2005 Edition – CRS Report for Congress, Congressional Research Service

Agriculture
Agriculture
Agriculture
Wikipedia glossaries using description lists